William Merrill may refer to:
 William Emery Merrill (1837–1891), American soldier and military engineer
 William Henry Merrill (1868–1923), American electrical engineer and founder of Underwriters Laboratories
 William P. Merrill (1867–1954), American theologian and hymn-writer
 William Stetson Merrill (1886–1969), American librarian

See also
 William Merrill Whitman (1911–1993), American lawyer and officer of the Panama Canal Company